The Peshawar cricket team was a Pakistani first-class cricket team from Peshawar. The team's home ground was Arbab Niaz Stadium in Peshawar. The List A and Twenty20 side was known as the Peshawar Panthers.

Peshawar first played in first-class competitions in 1956-57, and they have competed in most seasons since then, except for a hiatus between 1977-78 and 1983-84. Apart from a few matches played by North-West Frontier Province in the 1970s, Peshawar were usually the only first-class team from Khyber Pakhtunkhwa province (formerly known as North-West Frontier Province) until the debut of Abbottabad in 2005-06. 

Peshawar won the Quaid-i-Azam Trophy in 1998-99 and 2004-05 and the ABN-AMRO Cup National One-day Championship in 2006-07. They also won the 2011-12 Quaid-e-Azam Trophy Division Two. 

In first-class cricket to the end of 2013 they had played 262 matches, with 82 wins, 99 losses, 80 draws and one tie. Their highest individual score is 300 not out, by Shoaib Khan against Quetta in 2003-04. Their best bowling figures are 9 for 62 by Safiullah Khan against Railways B in 1971-72.

In List A cricket they have played 73 times, with 22 wins, 49 losses, one tie and one no-result.
 
Peshawar's notable players have included Haseeb Ahsan (their first Test player), Younis Khan, Yasir Hameed, Fazl-e-Akbar, Wajahatullah Wasti, Umar Gul and Arshad Khan.

In January 2017, they won the 2016–17 Regional One Day Cup, beating Karachi Whites by 124 runs in the final.

References

External links
 Lists of matches played by Peshawar

Pakistani first-class cricket teams
Sport in Peshawar